Francisco Trinaldo Soares da Rocha (born August 24, 1978) is a Brazilian mixed martial artist who competed in the welterweight division of the Ultimate Fighting Championship. A professional since 2006, he has also competed for Jungle Fight in his native Brazil, where he is the former Lightweight Champion, and was a competitor on The Ultimate Fighter: Brazil.

Mixed martial arts career

Background
Trinaldo began with an amateur career, compiling a record of 6-1 in mixed martial arts. He is also a three-time Brasilia State Kickboxing Champion, and began kickboxing when he was 23 years old before transitioning into mixed martial arts, holding a record of 12-1. Trinaldo is an ex-training partner of Paulo Thiago and Rani Yahya.

He spends most of his training time at the Evolução Thai, where he garnered considerable recognition, causing Sherdog.com to list him in August 2010 as their top prospect in MMA.

Trinaldo is regarded as being hampered by financial issues that prevented his rise further in the sport. Coming from a disadvantaged background, Trinaldo struggled and has been quoted as saying "Sometimes I can’t train because I don’t have money to catch a bus and go to the academy."

His nickname came from the character of the Brazilian TV show Casseta & Planeta Urgente played by the Brazilian comedian Cláudio Manoel named Massaranduba, who had his same quarrelsome attitude.

Early career
Trinaldo's professional career began in the Fight Club Tournament promotion, where he won his opening bout via unanimous decision. This was followed by a TKO due to corner stoppage.

Trinaldo then fought twice more, securing a submission victory via arm-triangle choke and another victory via TKO due to punches and soccer kicks after 12 seconds.

Bitetti Combat and Jungle Fight
Trinaldo's success continued when he joined Bitetti Combat in February 2010. Facing Luiz Firmino at Bitetti Combat 6, Trinaldo dominated, locking in a kneebar on his experienced opponent and forcing the tapout with ease.

Following this, Trinaldo joined the Jungle Fight Championship promotion and faced another experienced opponent in Flavio Alvaro. Late in the second round, Trinaldo secured a TKO victory due to punches, taking his professional record to 6-0.

Trinaldo suffered his first professional loss in September 2010, at the hands of future UFC fighter Iuri Alcântara via second round armbar.

Trinaldo then went on a four-fight winning streak in the Jungle Fight promotion with victories over Bruno Lobato, Joao Paulo, Derrick Burnsed and Adriano Martins, with the latter one earning him the Jungle Fight Lightweight belt.

The Ultimate Fighter
In March 2012, Trinaldo appeared as a fighter on The Ultimate Fighter: Brazil. He entered in the competition to fight in the Middleweight tournament. In the opening elimination fight, he defeated Charles Maicon by TKO in round 1 to get into the TUF house. He was then defeated by Thiago Perpétuo.

Ultimate Fighting Championship
Trinaldo competed on the live finale card which took place at UFC 147 on June 23, 2012 in Belo Horizonte, Brazil against Delson Heleno. Trinaldo won in his UFC debut via TKO in the first round. After the fight he expressed his desire to fight at 155 which is his natural weight.

Trinaldo returned to the lightweight division and faced Gleison Tibau on October 13, 2012 at UFC 153. He lost the fight via unanimous decision.

Trinaldo defeated C.J. Keith on January 19, 2013 at UFC on FX 7, locking up an arm-triangle choke early in the second round.

For his fourth UFC fight, Trinaldo faced Mike Rio on May 18, 2013 at UFC on FX 8. He won the fight via submission in the first round.

Trinaldo faced promotional newcomer Piotr Hallmann on September 4, 2013 at UFC Fight Night 28. After dominating the first round and hurting Hallmann twice with body kicks, Trinaldo lost the fight via kimura submission in the second round.

Trinaldo faced Jesse Ronson at UFC Fight Night 36. He won the fight via split decision.

Trinaldo faced Michael Chiesa on May 24, 2014 at UFC 173. He lost the fight via unanimous decision.

Trinaldo faced Leandro Silva at UFC Fight Night 51 on September 13, 2014. He won the fight by unanimous decision.

Trinaldo faced Akbarh Arreola on March 21, 2015 at UFC Fight Night 62. He won the fight by unanimous decision.

Trinaldo replaced an injured Gilbert Burns and fought Norman Parke on May 30, 2015 at UFC Fight Night 67. He won the fight by split decision.

Trinaldo faced Chad Laprise on August 23, 2015 at UFC Fight Night 74. He won the fight via TKO in the first round, after knocking his opponent down with a left hand and finishing with ground strikes, handing Laprise his first loss of his MMA career.

Trinaldo faced Ross Pearson on January 17, 2016 at UFC Fight Night 81. He won the fight via unanimous decision.

Trinaldo next faced Yancy Medeiros on May 14, 2016 at UFC 198. He won the fight via unanimous decision. Both participants were awarded Fight of the Night honors.

Trinaldo faced Paul Felder on September 24, 2016 at UFC Fight Night 95. He won the fight via TKO in the third round.

Trinaldo faced Kevin Lee on March 11, 2017 at UFC Fight Night 106.  After a back-and-forth first round, Trinaldo lost the fight via submission in the second round.

Trinaldo faced Jim Miller on October 28, 2017 at UFC Fight Night 119. He won the fight by unanimous decision.

Trinaldo faced James Vick on February 18, 2018 at UFC Fight Night: Cowboy vs. Medeiros. He lost the fight via unanimous decision.

Trinaldo faced Evan Dunham on September 22, 2018 at UFC Fight Night 137, He won the fight via knockout in the second round due to a knee to the body.

Trinaldo was originally set to face Islam Makhachev on January 26, 2019 at UFC 233, however, Makhachev was forced out of the bout due to undisclosed reasons and was replaced by Alexander Hernandez. In turn, Hernandez was pulled from that fight in favor of a bout with Donald Cerrone a week earlier at UFC Fight Night: Cejudo vs. Dillashaw. Subsequently, Trinaldo was pulled from the card entirely.

Trinaldo was scheduled to face Carlos Diego Ferreira on May 11, 2019 at UFC 237. However, Ferreira was forced out of the bout on weigh-in day as he was deemed medically unfit due to a weight cutting issue. As a result, the bout was cancelled.

Trinaldo faced Alexander Hernandez on July 20, 2019 at UFC on ESPN 4. He lost the fight via controversial unanimous decision, as 11 of 13 media outlets scoring the bout in favor of Trinaldo.

Trinaldo faced Bobby Green on November 16, 2019 at UFC Fight Night 164. He won the fight via unanimous decision.

Trinaldo faced John Makdessi on March 14, 2020 at UFC Fight Night 170. He won the fight via unanimous decision.

Trinaldo faced Jai Herbert on July 26, 2020 at UFC on ESPN 14. At the weigh-ins, Trinaldo weighed in at 160 pounds, four pounds over the lightweight non-title fight limit. His bout proceeded at a catchweight and he was fined 30% of his purse, which went to his opponent Jai Herbert. He won the fight via technical knockout in round three.

Move up to welterweight
After missing weight for the first time in his UFC career, Trinaldo moved up to welterweight and faced Muslim Salikhov at UFC Fight Night 189 on June 5, 2021. He lost the fight via unanimous decision.

Trinaldo faced Dwight Grant on October 23, 2021 at UFC Fight Night 196. He won the fight via split decision.

Trinaldo faced Danny Roberts on May 7, 2022 at UFC 274. He won the bout via unanimous decision.

Trinaldo faced Randy Brown on October 1, 2022 at UFC Fight Night 211. He lost the bout via unanimous decision.

Trinaldo was released by UFC in early January 2023 after the loss.

Championships and accomplishments

Mixed martial arts
Ultimate Fighting Championship
Fight of the Night (One time) 
Jungle Fight
Jungle Fight Lightweight Championship (One time)

Kickboxing
Brasília State Kickboxing Champion (Three times)

Mixed martial arts record

|-
|Loss
|align=center|28–9
|Randy Brown
|Decision (unanimous)
|UFC Fight Night: Dern vs. Yan
|
|align=center|3
|align=center|5:00
|Las Vegas, Nevada, United States
|
|-
|Win
|align=center|28–8
|Danny Roberts
|Decision (unanimous)
|UFC 274
|
|align=center|3
|align=center|5:00
|Phoenix, Arizona, United States
|
|-
|Win
|align=center|27–8
|Dwight Grant
|Decision (split)
|UFC Fight Night: Costa vs. Vettori
|
|align=center|3
|align=center|5:00
|Las Vegas, Nevada, United States
|
|-
|Loss
|align=center|26–8
|Muslim Salikhov
|Decision (unanimous)
|UFC Fight Night: Rozenstruik vs. Sakai
|
|align=center|3
|align=center|5:00
|Las Vegas, Nevada, United States
|
|-
|Win
|align=center|26–7
|Jai Herbert
|TKO (punch)
|UFC on ESPN: Whittaker vs. Till
|
|align=center|3
|align=center|1:30
|Abu Dhabi, United Arab Emirates
|
|-
|Win
|align=center|25–7
|John Makdessi
|Decision (unanimous)
|UFC Fight Night: Lee vs. Oliveira
|
|align=center|3
|align=center|5:00
|Brasília, Brazil
|
|-
|Win
|align=center|24–7
|Bobby Green
|Decision (unanimous)
|UFC Fight Night: Błachowicz vs. Jacaré
|
|align=center|3
|align=center|5:00
|São Paulo, Brazil
|
|-
|Loss
|align=center|23–7
|Alexander Hernandez
|Decision (unanimous)
|UFC on ESPN: dos Anjos vs. Edwards
|
|align=center|3
|align=center|5:00
|San Antonio, Texas, United States
|
|-
|Win
|align=center|23–6
|Evan Dunham
|TKO (knee to the body)
|UFC Fight Night: Santos vs. Anders
|
|align=center|2
|align=center|4:10
|São Paulo, Brazil
|
|-
|Loss
|align=center|22–6
|James Vick
|Decision (unanimous)
|UFC Fight Night: Cowboy vs. Medeiros
|
|align=center|3
|align=center|5:00
|Austin, Texas, United States
|
|-  
|Win
|align=center|22–5
|Jim Miller
|Decision (unanimous)
|UFC Fight Night: Brunson vs. Machida
|
|align=center|3
|align=center|5:00
|São Paulo, Brazil
|
|-
|Loss
|align=center|21–5
|Kevin Lee
|Submission (rear-naked choke) 
|UFC Fight Night: Belfort vs. Gastelum
|
|align=center|2
|align=center|3:12
|Fortaleza, Brazil
|
|-
|Win
|align=center|21–4
|Paul Felder
| TKO (doctor stoppage) 
|UFC Fight Night: Cyborg vs. Länsberg
|
|align=center|3
|align=center|2:25
|Brasília, Brazil
|
|-
|Win
|align=center|20–4
|Yancy Medeiros
|Decision (unanimous)
|UFC 198
|
|align=center|3
|align=center|5:00
|Curitiba, Brazil
|
|-
|Win
|align=center|19–4
|Ross Pearson
|Decision (unanimous)
|UFC Fight Night: Dillashaw vs. Cruz
|
|align=center|3
|align=center|5:00
|Boston, Massachusetts, United States
|
|-
|Win
|align=center|18–4
|Chad Laprise
|TKO (punches)
|UFC Fight Night: Holloway vs. Oliveira
|
|align=center|1
|align=center|2:43
|Saskatoon, Saskatchewan, Canada
|
|-
| Win
| align=center| 17–4
| Norman Parke
| Decision (split)
| UFC Fight Night: Condit vs. Alves
| 
| align=center| 3
| align=center| 5:00
| Goiânia, Brazil
| 
|-
| Win
| align=center| 16–4
| Akbarh Arreola
| Decision (unanimous)
| UFC Fight Night: Maia vs. LaFlare
| 
| align=center| 3
| align=center| 5:00
| Rio de Janeiro, Brazil
| 
|-
| Win
| align=center| 15–4
| Leandro Silva
| Decision (unanimous)
| UFC Fight Night: Bigfoot vs. Arlovski
| 
| align=center| 3 
| align=center| 5:00 
| Brasília, Brazil
| 
|-
| Loss
| align=center| 14–4
| Michael Chiesa
| Decision (unanimous)
| UFC 173
| 
| align=center| 3
| align=center| 5:00
| Las Vegas, Nevada, United States
| 
|-
| Win
| align=center| 14–3
| Jesse Ronson
| Decision (split)
| UFC Fight Night: Machida vs. Mousasi
| 
| align=center| 3
| align=center| 5:00
| Jaraguá do Sul, Brazil
| 
|-
| Loss
| align=center| 13–3
| Piotr Hallmann
| Submission (kimura)
| UFC Fight Night: Teixeira vs. Bader
| 
| align=center| 2
| align=center| 3:50
| Belo Horizonte, Brazil
| 
|-
| Win
| align=center| 13–2
| Mike Rio
| Submission (arm-triangle choke)
| UFC on FX: Belfort vs. Rockhold
| 
| align=center| 1
| align=center| 3:08
| Jaraguá do Sul, Brazil
| 
|-
| Win
| align=center| 12–2
| C.J. Keith
| Submission (arm-triangle choke)
| UFC on FX: Belfort vs. Bisping
| 
| align=center| 2
| align=center| 1:50
| São Paulo, Brazil
| 
|-
| Loss
| align=center| 11–2
| Gleison Tibau
| Decision (unanimous)
| UFC 153
| 
| align=center| 3
| align=center| 5:00
| Rio de Janeiro, Brazil
|
|-
| Win
| align=center| 11–1
| Delson Heleno
| TKO (punches)
| UFC 147
| 
| align=center| 1
| align=center| 4:21
| Belo Horizonte, Brazil
| 
|-
| Win
| align=center| 10–1
| Adriano Martins
| Decision (majority)
| Jungle Fight 30
| 
| align=center| 3
| align=center| 5:00
| Belém, Brazil
| 
|-
| Win
| align=center| 9–1
| Derrick Burnsed
| KO (punch)
| Jungle Fight 28
| 
| align=center| 2
| align=center| 0:52
| Rio de Janeiro, Brazil
| 
|-
| Win
| align=center| 8–1
| João Paulo Rodrigues
| Decision (unanimous)
| Jungle Fight 25
| 
| align=center| 3
| align=center| 5:00
| Vila Velha, Brazil
| 
|-
| Win
| align=center| 7–1
| Bruno Lobato
| Submission (anaconda choke)
| Jungle Fight 24
| 
| align=center| 1
| align=center| 2:24
| Rio de Janeiro, Brazil
| 
|-
| Loss
| align=center| 6–1
| Iuri Alcântara
| Submission (armbar)
| Jungle Fight 22
| 
| align=center| 2
| align=center| 2:24
| São Paulo, Brazil
| 
|-
| Win
| align=center| 6–0
| Flavio Alvaro
| TKO (punches)
| Jungle Fight 20
| 
| align=center| 2
| align=center| 4:01
| São Paulo, Brazil
|
|-
| Win
| align=center| 5–0
| Luiz Firmino
| Submission (kneebar)
| Bitetti Combat MMA 6
| 
| align=center| 1
| align=center| 2:03
| Brasília, Brazil
| 
|-
| Win
| align=center| 4–0
| Junior Lava
| TKO (punches and soccer kicks)
| Norofight 1
| 
| align=center| 1
| align=center| 0:12
| Unaí, Brazil
| 
|-
| Win
| align=center| 3–0
| Marcone Bezerra
| Submission (arm-triangle choke)
| Hero's The Jungle 2
| 
| align=center| 1
| align=center| N/A
| Manaus, Brazil
|
|-
| Win
| align=center| 2–0
| Vinicius Dohrer
| TKO (corner stoppage)
| Fight Club Tournament 3
| 
| align=center| 2
| align=center| N/A
| Taguatinga, Brazil
| 
|-
| Win
| align=center| 1–0
| Edval Pedroso
| Decision (unanimous)
| Fight Club Tournament 2
| 
| align=center| 3
| align=center| 5:00
| Taguatinga, Brazil
|

Mixed martial arts exhibition record

|-
|Loss
|align=center|1–1
|Thiago Perpétuo
|TKO (retirement)
|The Ultimate Fighter: Brazil
| (airdate)
|align=center|1
|align=center|5:00
|São Paulo, Brazil
|
|-
|Win
|align=center|1–0
|Charles Maicon
|TKO (punches)
|The Ultimate Fighter: Brazil
| (airdate)
|align=center|1
|align=center|0:00
|São Paulo, Brazil
|
|-

See also

 List of male mixed martial artists

References

External links
 
 

Brazilian male mixed martial artists
Lightweight mixed martial artists
Mixed martial artists utilizing kickboxing
Mixed martial artists utilizing Brazilian jiu-jitsu
Living people
Sportspeople from Piauí
1978 births
Ultimate Fighting Championship male fighters
Brazilian male kickboxers
Brazilian practitioners of Brazilian jiu-jitsu